Zhang Qing is a fictional character in Water Margin, one of the four great classical novels in Chinese literature. Nicknamed "Featherless Arrow", he ranks 16th among the 36 Heavenly Spirits, the first third of the 108 Stars of Destiny.

Background
The novel depicts Zhang Qing as a handsome, energetic and agile warrior with waist like that of a wolf, arms like those of an ape and a body like that of a tiger. Originally from Zhangde Prefecture (彰德府; present-day Anyang, Henan), he serves as the garrison commandant of Dongchang Prefecture (東昌府; present-day Liaocheng, Shandong). He is nicknamed "Featherless Arrow" because he can fling stones with deadly accuracy.

Joining Liangshan
When a force from Liangshan Marsh led by Lu Junyi comes to demand food from Dongchang, Zhang Qing rides out to fight them. He awes the outlaws when he injures Hao Siwen with a stone. 

Song Jiang comes to reinforce Lu Junyi. As Zhang Qing takes on one after another on horseback some of Liangshan's top warriors, he again displays his deadly stone-hurling skill. He injures or shocks Xu Ning, Yan Shun, Han Tao, Peng Qi, Xuan Zan, Huyan Zhuo, Yang Zhi, Zhu Tong, Lei Heng, and Suo Chao with his stones. He even captures Liu Tang, who, challenging him on foot, is knocked over with a stone. Guan Sheng could feel the impact of Zhang's stone when his sabre quivers as he whacks it away. Dong Ping, who knows Zhang Qing well having been the commandant in neighbouring Dongping prefecture, manages to dodge his stones and gets close to him. The two tussle on horseback when Zhang, abandoning his spear, seizes the far ends of Dong's two spears. Meanwhile, Gong Wang and Ding Desun, Zhang's two lieutenants, are captured, the first by Lin Chong and Hua Rong and the other by Lü Fang and Guo Sheng. Finding himself now unaided, Zhang feels nervous and gallops back to his own ranks. Dong pursues him and, forgetting to dodge, is nearly hit by a stone which scrapes past his ear.

Angry over the injuries of his men but appreciative of Zhang's stone-flinging skill, Song Jiang is determined to capture and win over the commandant. Wu Yong, Liangshan's chief strategist, proposes setting up an ambush. When told that a convoy of ration is approaching Song Jiang's camp, Zhang, seeing a chance to cut off Liangshan's food supply, leaves the city to intercept it. Lu Zhishen, who is leading the convoy, is knocked over by Zhang's stone. Wu Song drags Lu away. Thinking he could succeed a second time, Zhang Qing moves to attack Liangshan's ration-loaded boats moored at a riverbank. But Gongsun Sheng engulfs him in darkness with his magic. Losing his way, Zhang Qing falls into the river and is captured.

Song Jiang's sincere and warm treatment convinces Zhang Qing to surrender. Zhang then tricks the prefect of Dongchang to open the city's gate, causing its fall. Zhang also recommends veterinary physician Huangfu Duan to Song, whose recruitment greatly benefits Liangshan as its horses require expert care.

Campaigns and death
Zhang Qing is appointed as one of the Eight Tiger Cub Vanguard Generals of the Liangshan cavalry after the 108 Stars of Destiny came together in what is called the grand Assembly. He participates in the campaigns against the Liao invaders and rebels in Song territory following amnesty from Emperor Huizong for Liangshan.

Zhang Qing scores the top credit in the campaign against Tian Hu when he captures the rebel leader with the help of Qiong Ying, the foster daughter of one of Tian's followers. Zhang marries Qiong, who bears him a son named Zhang Jie. Qiong Ying is also an excellent stone thrower.

In the battle of Dusong Pass (獨松關; located south of present-day Anji County, Zhejiang) in the campaign against Fang La, Zhang Qing and Dong Ping come to combat with Li Tianrun, one of Fang's top warriors. Although injured in an arm by a projectile, Dong Ping continues to fight Li on horseback. When he retreats to treat his wound, Zhang Qing takes over the fight. He misses a stab on Li and has his spear stuck in a tree. As he struggles to pull it out, Li stabs him in the abdomen and kills him. When the campaign ends, the remains of Zhang Qing are sent back to Zhangde for burial.

References
 
 
 
 
 
 
 

36 Heavenly Spirits
Fictional characters from Henan